William Sullivan may refer to:

Government
William J. Sullivan (born 1939), American judge on the Connecticut Supreme Court
William H. Sullivan (1922–2013), United States diplomat
William Sullivan (Kentucky politician) (1921–2013), Kentucky state senator
William C. Sullivan (1912–1977), former head of the Federal Bureau of Investigation's intelligence operations
William T. Sullivan (1894–1968), Wisconsin state representative
Sir Bill Sullivan (politician) (1891–1967), New Zealand minister of labour
William P. Sullivan (1870–1925), Missouri state representative
William Wilfred Sullivan (1839–1920), premier of Prince Edward Island
William V. Sullivan (1857–1918), United States senator from Mississippi
William F. Sullivan, associate justice for the Massachusetts Superior Court

Sports
William Sullivan (cricketer) (1877-1924), Australian cricketer
William Sullivan (field hockey) (1909–1981), Indian field hockey player
Bill Sullivan (outfielder) (1853–1884), Irish baseball player
Bill Sullivan (pitcher) (1868–1905), baseball player for the Syracuse Stars
Billy Sullivan (American football) (1915–1998), owner of an original franchise, the Boston Patriots, of the American Football League
Billy Sullivan (baseball) (1875–1965), major league catcher
Billy Sullivan Jr. (1910–1994), his son, baseball catcher
William Sullivan (pitcher) (1864–1911), baseball player for the St. Louis Maroons

Others
William John Sullivan (born 1976), software freedom activist, hacker, and writer
William Laurence Sullivan (1872–1935), Unitarian clergyman and author
William L. Sullivan (author) (born 1953), American author
William D. Sullivan, United States Navy officer
William Matheus Sullivan (1885–1947), American lawyer and art patron
William Holmes Sullivan (1836–1908), British painter
William N. Sullivan (1908–1979), American entomologist
William Kirby Sullivan (1822–1890), Irish philologist
Billy Sullivan (actor) (1891–1946), American character actor
William "Rocky" Sullivan, character in Angels with Dirty Faces
Bill Sullivan (artist) (1942–2010), American painter, printmaker and publisher

See also
William O'Sullivan (disambiguation)